Haymill Valley is a   Local Nature Reserve in Slough in Berkshire. It is owned by Slough Borough Council and managed by the Berkshire, Buckinghamshire and Oxfordshire Wildlife Trust. The site is known locally as The Millie.

Geography and site
The site features ancient woodland with extensive reed beds and ponds fed by Two Mill Brook (also known as Two Mile Brook), which flows from Burnham Beeches into the Thames. At the reserve's southernmost end is a site of an ancient watermill.

The site features a pair of 7 foot metal sculptures of Kingfishers called the Millie Kingfishers, which were added in 2008.

History

Haymill Valley Nature Reserve was declared a local nature reserve status in 1994 by Slough Borough Council.

Fauna

The site has the following fauna:

Mammals

Wood mouse

Invertebrates

Gonepteryx rhamni
Celastrina argiolus
Anthocharis cardamines
Pararge aegeria
White-letter hairstreak

Birds

Eurasian blue tit
Great tit
European green woodpecker
Sylvia atricapilla
Phylloscopus collybita
Fulica atra
Dendrocopos major
Alcedo atthis
Gallinula chloropus
Emberiza schoeniclus
Acrocephalus scirpaceus
Phylloscopus trochilus

Flora

The site has the following flora:

Trees

Crataegus

Plants

Caltha palustris
Hyacinthoides non-scripta
Iris pseudacorus

References

Berkshire, Buckinghamshire and Oxfordshire Wildlife Trust
Local Nature Reserves in Berkshire
Slough